The 2011 Milton Keynes Council election took place on 5 May 2011 to elect members of Milton Keynes Unitary Council in Buckinghamshire, England. One third of the council – the 17 seats contested in the 2007 election – was up for election and the council, which totalled 51 seats, remained under no overall control.

After the election, the composition of the council was:
Conservative 21 (+4)
Liberal Democrat 18 (–4)
Labour 9
Independent 3

Election results
The Conservative Party won four seats from the Liberal Democrats – in Emerson Valley, Linford South, Sherington and Walton Park. All other seats remained in the same hands. Two Liberal Democrats representatives had become Independent seats between the 2010 and 2011 elections.

Ward results

References

2011 English local elections
2011
2010s in Buckinghamshire